A ka statue is a type of ancient Egyptian statue intended to provide a resting place for the ka (life-force or spirit) of the person after death. The ancient Egyptians believed the ka, along with the physical body, the name, the ba (personality or soul), and the šwt (shadow), made up the five aspects of a person.

Purpose and use
After death, the ethereal aspects of the soul were believed to be released from the body, free to roam the earth, but required the physical body or a surrogate, such as the ka statue, to return to as a permanent home.

Ka statues could also be set up as a type of memorial for the deceased in absentia; for example in Abydos hundreds were set up to allow the dead to participate in the yearly festivals commemorating the resurrection of Osiris.

Because the ancient Egyptians believed statues could magically perceive the world, they were ceremonially brought to life by priests in a special ritual called the opening of the mouth ceremony. In the full version of this ceremony, the mouth, eyes, nose, and ears could be touched with ritual implements to give the statue the power of breath, sight, smell, and hearing.

Design and construction

Ka statues were usually carved from wood or stone and sometimes painted in the likeness of the owner to reinforce the spiritual connection and preserve the person's memory for eternity. Many ka statues were placed in a purpose-built mortuary chapel, or niche, which could be covered with appropriate inscriptions. Like most ancient Egyptian statuary, ka statues display a rigid frontalism in which the body faces squarely forward in a formal way. Whether seated or standing, their posture reflects the need for the statue to "see" the real world in front of them and conform to an ideal standard of beauty and perfection.

The hieroglyph representing the ka is a pair of upraised arms. It is sometimes depicted on top of the head of the statue to reinforce its intended purpose.

See also
Art of ancient Egypt
Ancient Egyptian religion

References

Ancient Egyptian funerary practices
Sculptures of ancient Egypt